The Fight Continues (Swedish: Striden går vidare) is a 1941 Swedish drama film directed by Gustaf Molander and starring Victor Sjöström, Renée Björling and Anne-Margrethe Björlin.

The film's art direction was by Arne Åkermark.

Partial cast
 Victor Sjöström as Andreas Berg  
 Renée Björling as Betty Berg 
 Anne-Margrethe Björlin as Inga Berg  
 Erik 'Bullen' Berglund as Dr. Eriksson  
 Alf Kjellin as Dr. Georg Hammar  
 Gerd Hagman as Nurse Maria Granberg  
 Nils Lundell as Kurre Karlsson  
 Carl Ström as Arnell  
 Elsa Ebbesen as Anna, nurse  
 Carl Deurell as Prof. Karlgren  
 Kotti Chave as Dr. Ström  
 Gösta Terserus as Dr. Lundin  
 Olav Riégo as Dr. Fagrell  
 Karl Erik Flens as Doctor  
 Helge Mauritz as Doctor  
 Yngve Nyqvist as Doctor  
 Hjördis Petterson as Augusta Sofia Svensson, alcoholic 
 Hilda Borgström as Mrs. Hagberg  
 Oscar Ljung as Allan Hagberg  
 John Ekman as Lundström  
 Josua Bengtson as Man in waiting room 
 Ernst Brunman as Patient  
 Ingemar Holde as Man in City Hall 
 Aurore Palmgren as Nurse  
 Ingrid Envall as Ingrid, nurse  
 Gerda Boman as Nurse  
 Birgitta Valberg as Nurse  
 Stig Olin as Judge  
 Hartwig Fock as Soccer player's father  
 Linnéa Hillberg as Jenny  
 Wilma Malmlöf as Lady at Newsstand  
 Lisa Wirström as Woman at the newsstand  
 Gun Adler as Nurse in waitingroom  
 Emmy Albiin as Woman in the newsstand  
 Gösta Bodin
 Eric Dahlström 
 Margit Andelius as Lady in Waiting Room  
 Mona Geijer-Falkner as Berg's Maid  
 Hugo Björne as Judge 
 Axel Lagerberg as Lawyer  
 Victor Thorén as Waiter at Djurgårdsbrunn  
 Margareta Bergman as Woman in waiting room

References

Bibliography 
 Mariah Larsson & Anders Marklund. Swedish Film: An Introduction and Reader. Nordic Academic Press, 2010.

External links 
 

1941 films
1941 drama films
Swedish drama films
1940s Swedish-language films
Films directed by Gustaf Molander
Swedish black-and-white films
1940s Swedish films